The Canon PowerShot SX60 HS is a digital ultra-zoom bridge camera announced by Canon Inc. on September 15, 2014. It has one of the longest zoom ranges of any digital camera. It features a 65x optical zoom that covers the 35mm equivalent of 21-1365mm. It is the first Canon camera in this class that has an external microphone jack.

Compared to SX50

References

External links
 
 Review by Imaging Resource

SX60 HS
Cameras introduced in 2014
Superzoom cameras